Aldolase A (ALDOA, or ALDA), also known as fructose-bisphosphate aldolase, is an enzyme that in humans is encoded by the ALDOA gene on chromosome 16.

The protein encoded by this gene is a glycolytic enzyme that catalyzes the reversible conversion of fructose-1,6-bisphosphate to glyceraldehyde 3-phosphate (G3P) and dihydroxyacetone phosphate (DHAP). Three aldolase isozymes (A, B, and C), encoded by three different genes, are differentially expressed during development. Aldolase A is found in the developing embryo and is produced in even greater amounts in adult muscle. Aldolase A expression is repressed in adult liver, kidney and intestine and similar to aldolase C levels in brain and other nervous tissue. Aldolase A deficiency has been associated with myopathy and hemolytic anemia. Alternative splicing and alternative promoter usage results in multiple transcript variants. Related pseudogenes have been identified on chromosomes 3 and 10. [provided by RefSeq, Aug 2011]

Structure
ALDOA is a homotetramer and one of the three aldolase isozymes (A, B, and C), encoded by three different genes. The ALDOA gene contains 8 exons and the 5' UTR IB. Key amino acids responsible for its catalytic function have been identified. The residue Tyr363 functions as the acid–base catalyst for protonating C3 of the substrate, while Lys146 is proposed to stabilize the negative charge of the resulting conjugate base of Tyr363 and the strained configuration of the C-terminal. Residue Glu187 participates in multiple functions, including FBP aldolase catalysis, acid–base catalysis during substrate binding, dehydration, and substrate cleavage. Though ALDOA localizes to the nucleus, it lacks any known nuclear localization signals (NLS).

Mechanism

In mammalian aldolase, the key catalytic amino acid residues involved in the reaction are lysine and tyrosine. The tyrosine acts as an efficient hydrogen acceptor while the lysine covalently binds and stabilizes the intermediates. Many bacteria use two magnesium ions in place of the lysine. 

   

The numbering of the carbon atoms indicates the fate of the carbons according to their position in fructose 6-phosphate.

Function
ALDOA is a key enzyme in the fourth step of glycolysis, as well as in the reverse pathway gluconeogenesis. It catalyzes the reversible conversion of fructose-1,6-bisphosphate to glyceraldehydes-3-phosphate and dihydroxyacetone phosphate by aldol cleavage of the C3–C4 bond. As a result, it is a crucial player in ATP biosynthesis. ALDOA also contributes to other "moonlighting" functions such as muscle maintenance, regulation of cell shape and motility, striated muscle contraction, actin cytoskeleton organization, and regulation of cell proliferation. ALDOA likely regulates actin cytoskeleton remodeling through interacting with cytohesin-2 (ARNO) and Arf6.

ALDOA is ubiquitously expressed in most tissues, though it is predominantly expressed in developing embryo and adult muscle. In lymphocytes, ALDOA is the predominant aldolase isoform. Within the cell, ALDOA typically localizes to the cytoplasm, but it can localize to the nucleus during DNA synthesis of the cell cycle S phase. This nuclear localization is regulated by the protein kinases AKT and p38. It is suggested that the nucleus serves as a reservoir for ALDOA in low glucose conditions. ALDOA has also been found in mitochondria.

ALDOA is regulated by the energy metabolism substrates glucose, lactate, and glutamine. In human mast cells (MCs), ALDOA has been observed to undergo post-translational regulation by protein tyrosine nitration, which may alter its relative affinity for FBP and/or IP3. This change then affects IP3 and PLC signaling cascades in IgE-dependent responses.

Clinical significance
Aldolase A (ALDOA) is highly expressed in multiple cancers, including lung squamous cell carcinoma (LSCC), renal cancer, and hepatocellular carcinoma. It is proposed that ALDOA overexpression enhances glycolysis in these tumor cells, promoting their growth. In LSCC, its upregulation correlates with metastasis and poor prognosis, while its downregulation reduces tumor cell motility and tumorigenesis. Thus, ALDOA could be a potential LSCC biomarker and therapeutic drug target.

Aldolase A deficiency is a rare, autosomal recessive disorder that is linked to hemolysis and accompanied by weakness, muscle pain, and myopathy.

Interactive pathway map

Interactions
Aldolase A has been shown to interact with: 
PLD2, 
actin,
GLUT4,
phospholipase D2,
light chain 8 of dynein, 
erythrocyte anion exchanger Band 3 protein,
ryanodine receptor,
Cytohesin-2, and
V-ATPase (vacuolar-type H+-ATPase).

See also
ALDOB
ALDOC
Fructose-bisphosphate aldolase

References

Further reading

External links
 http://pdbdev.sdsc.edu:48346/pdb/molecules/pdb50_5.html
 
 
 
 
 PDBe-KB provides an overview of all the structure information available in the PDB for Human Fructose-bisphosphate aldolase A

Enzymes
Glycolysis